In the United States certified mortgage planner is a designation for the purpose of establishing a new professional category in the mortgage sector: one that arose as a response to criticisms of the mortgage banking industry. The term "mortgage planner" has been adopted as a generic niche term for mortgage originators who choose to assist borrowers on a more personal level by incorporating the mortgage decision with a borrowers short and long-term financial objectives.  The term "certified mortgage planner" is an effort to validate through education and subsequent certification a mortgage originator that has had specific training for the purpose of incorporating the mortgage decision with a Borrowers short and long-term financial objectives.

Origins of the term 
The terms certified mortgage planning and certified mortgage planner were first used by the NAMP (National Association of Mortgage Professionals). The term Mortgage Planner was first coined by Tim Hester to mark a clear distinction between the new approach to mortgage origination and the existing practices encompassed by mortgage brokering.

The effort to create a certification process around the mortgage planning concept was stemmed from those within the mortgage industry desiring to combat the negative effects of the mortgage industry having been commoditized.

Proponents of mortgage planning, such as NAMP, argue that mortgage brokers have no fiduciary obligation to the consumer and are essentially independent contractors.  This is in contrast to other related occupations, such as financial advisors and real estate agents, where agency is more clearly defined.

While mortgage brokering license requirements do exist, they are maintained on a state level, and enforcement is often difficult. This factor, in conjunction with the rise in unconventional mortgage products between 1999 and 2006, has led to some brokers taking advantage of unsuspecting consumers.

To fulfill demand from some consumers for agency or advisory services, some mortgage professionals took an arguably different approach, and created the concept of certified mortgage planning. While superficially simple, mortgages are very complex financial products that are difficult for some lay consumers to understand. Certified mortgage planners aim to educate consumers into the nuances of home loans, and assist them to find the most beneficial mortgage product and payment strategy.

Tasks of a certified mortgage planner 
Certified mortgage planners work in concert with other finance professionals, including certified financial planners , to ensure that consumer home finance products are in alignment with market trends, both current and historic. The deliverable of a certified mortgage planner is a "mortgage plan" designed to maximize home equity while wisely managing debt.

Training 
Mortgage planners must have regional mortgage licensing, undergo structured training, and pass a battery of tests in order to be certified by private certified mortgage planning institutions . They must also pursue and document ongoing training regarding the mortgage banking industry, the markets that impact home finance products, the role of interfacing with financial services professionals, and the methods, means, and ethics associated with advising consumers on home mortgages.

Benefits and criticisms

Benefits 
Proponents of certified mortgage planning argue that consumers often only tap into home equity during times of personal financial crisis. They argue this strategy can lead to serious misallocations and miscalculations that heavily impact the long term financial picture of borrowers. To counter this, supporters of certified mortgage planning recommended that consumers work closely with financial planners and mortgage planners to create a plan of action that takes into account the larger market forces and their own long-term goals.

Criticisms 
Critics of the mortgage planning approach counter this claim with the statement "sometimes people just want a mortgage and then to be left alone". That is, savvy buyers are capable of shopping among mortgage brokers rather than have a mortgage agent shop for them, regardless of how knowledgeable, ethical or affordable they are.

Another criticism stems from the claim that mortgage planning is not a new concept, and seems to have grown out of the "debt management" movement popular in the late 1990s. The concept of "upfront mortgage brokers" who will fully disclose their compensation can be seen as another example of this broader trend.

There are very few nationwide standards on what fiduciary/agency allegiances a certified mortgage planner is supposed to have. Certified mortgage planners gain certification from private institutions, with certification not being necessarily consistent. This issue, plus the fact that the title certified mortgage planner is often confused with mortgage planner, makes the overall term confusing to consumers.

The selection of the term certified mortgage planner has come under scrutiny for sounding too similar to certified public accountant. CPA is the statutory title of qualified accountants in the United States who have passed the Uniform Certified Public Accountant Examination and have met additional state education and experience requirements for certification, while CMPs take a private test without such extensive education and are basically not accountable outside of fraud.

Tools of the trade 
The mortgage planner uses many tools in his practice which in conjunction with their education allow them to create a "mortgage plan" for their client. These tools often include, but are not limited to, advanced software to compare mortgage products in a side be side comparison, credit scoring services to determine the best way to help a client to qualify for a particular program, and additional financial or debt management programs which create additional options for the client and the mortgage planner to use to achieve their goals.

References 

Mortgage industry of the United States
Financial services occupations
Professional certification in finance